Belgium competed at the 2012 Summer Olympics in London, United Kingdom, from 27 July to 12 August 2012. The Belgian Olympic Committee sent the nation's largest delegation to the Games since 1976. A total of 119 athletes, 75 men and 44 women, competed in 16 sports. There was only a single competitor in slalom canoeing, BMX cycling, equestrian dressage, rowing, shooting, table tennis, and weightlifting. Field hockey was the only team event in which Belgium was represented at these Olympic games.

The Belgian team featured twins and national track stars Kevin and Jonathan Borlée, and the defending champion Tia Hellebaut in the women's high jump. Hellebaut was also appointed by the Belgian Olympic Committee to carry the nation's flag at the opening ceremony. Table tennis player and multiple-time world champion Jean-Michel Saive became the first Belgian athlete to compete in seven Olympic games. Equestrian show jumper Jos Lansink was also at his seventh Olympic appearance as an individual athlete, having participated as part of the Belgian team since 2004 (three of his appearances were representing the Netherlands).

Belgium, however, failed to win the gold medal for the first time since 2004, leaving with only three medals. Judoka Charline Van Snick and laser sailor Evi Van Acker settled for the bronze medals in their respective sports, while Lionel Cox won the silver in rifle shooting.

Medalists

Athletics

Belgian athletes have so far achieved qualifying standards in the following athletics events (up to a maximum of 3 athletes in each event at the 'A' Standard, and 1 at the 'B' Standard):

Key
 Note – Ranks given for track events are within the athlete's heat only
 Q = Qualified for the next round
 q = Qualified for the next round as a fastest loser or, in field events, by position without achieving the qualifying target
 NR = National record
 N/A = Round not applicable for the event
 Bye = Athlete not required to compete in round

Men
Track & road events

* Competed in heats only

Combined events – Decathlon

Women
Track & road events

Field events

Combined events – Heptathlon

Badminton

Canoeing

Slalom
Belgium has so far qualified boats for the following events

Sprint
Belgium has so far qualified boats for the following events

Qualification Legend: FA = Qualify to final (medal); FB = Qualify to final B (non-medal)

Cycling

Road
Men

Women

Track
Pursuit

Omnium

The Belgian Olympic Committee sent Gijs Van Hoecke home from the London Games after pictures appeared in British newspapers of him looking drunk and being carried into a taxi after a night out in the city.

Mountain biking

Men

BMX

Equestrian

Dressage

Eventing
Qualified places

Show jumping

Field hockey

Both the men's team and women's team have qualified and will consist of 16 players each.

Men's tournament

Group play

5th/6th place

Women's tournament

Group play

11th/12th place

Gymnastics

Artistic
Men

Women

Judo

Rowing 

Belgium has qualified the following boats.

Men

Qualification Legend: FA=Final A (medal); FB=Final B (non-medal); FC=Final C (non-medal); FD=Final D (non-medal); FE=Final E (non-medal); FF=Final F (non-medal); SA/B=Semifinals A/B; SC/D=Semifinals C/D; SE/F=Semifinals E/F; QF=Quarterfinals; R=Repechage

Sailing

Men

Women

M = Medal race; EL = Eliminated – did not advance into the medal race

Shooting

Men

Swimming

Swimmers have so far achieved qualifying standards in the following events (up to a maximum of 2 swimmers in each event at the Olympic Qualifying Time (OQT), and potentially 1 at the Olympic Selection Time (OST)):

Men

Women

Table tennis

Tennis

Triathlon

Belgium has qualified the following athletes.

Weightlifting

Belgium has qualified 1 man.

See also
Belgium at the 2012 Winter Youth Olympics
Belgium at the 2012 Summer Paralympics

References

Nations at the 2012 Summer Olympics
2012
Summer Olympics